Orbitestellidae are a family of minute sea snails, marine gastropod molluscs or micromolluscs in the infraclassis Lower Heterobranchia.

Genera
Genera within the family Orbitestellidae include:
 Boschitestella Moolenbeek, 1994
 Lurifax Warén & Bouchet, 2001
 Microdiscula Thiele, 1912
 Orbitestella Iredale, 1917

References

 
 Powell A. W. B., New Zealand Mollusca, William Collins Publishers Ltd, Auckland, New Zealand 1979 
 ZipCodeZoo

 
Gastropod families